PT Triangle Motorindo is a private Indonesian automotive manufacturer based in Semarang, Central Java. Its tradename is Viar Motor Indonesia or simply Viar. Main products of Viar are motor trikes, scooter motorcycles, underbone motorcycles, sport bikes, electric motorbikes, motocross, and ATV.

History 
PT Triangle Motorindo is founded in February 2000 and started to import Taiwanese motorcycle in CBU (Completely Built-Up) scheme in July 2000. In July 2001, CKD (Completely Knocked-Down) assembly begins. In October 2001, Viar Taiwan Motorcycle project Apollo generation begins, the assembly is carried out by IKD (Incompletely Knocked-Down) scheme using Taiwan engine components and assisted by experts from Taiwan. In June 2003, the phase II integrated plant was officially operational and the Viar Speed generation went into production. The use of local components is increasingly encouraged. Phase III of the integrated plant was completed in July 2007 and continued with the development of production lines, QC, R&B, and Engineering Technology for the future production. In July of the same year, the construction of the integrated factory Phase IV begins with preparations for the construction of a modern and integrated automotive industrial area. The amount of phase IV investment is 20 million USD. In May 2011 the factory at Bukit Semarang Baru officially started operating. The entire production process is carried out in the newest factory. The integrated development of Phase V of warehouse expansion (north part) for spare parts and finished units storage was carried out in June 2013.

Currently, Viar exports motorcycles abroad, such as countries in Africa, the Caribbean, Laos, Myanmar, Yemen, Nicaragua, El Salvador and Oceania.

Facilities 
Viar has 2 production facilities:
 Factory I (Terboyo Industrial Park): The first factory was established in December 2000 in the Terboyo Industrial area, Semarang. Here the production system that started from CBU (Completely Built-Up) increased to CKD (Completely Knocked-Down). Each month, this factory is capable of producing as many as 25,000 units.
 Factory II (Bukit Semarang Baru): Established in mid 2007 and officially operating in 2011, which replaced the previous factory. It is at this factory that this product becomes an automotive company from Indonesia that assembles its own production. This factory have the latest equipment and supplies in the automotive industry in Indonesia and become the first motorcycle factory in Indonesia to also produce its own original spare parts.

Models 
 Viar Apollo 
 Viar Vix R 
 Viar Vior 125 
 Viar Vortex 250 
 Viar Karya/Viar Cargo/Viar Triton
 Viar Karya BIT 100/Viar Mini Cargo/Viar Mini Triton
 Viar Cross X
 Viar Cross X 200 GT
 Viar Razor/Viar Bulldog
 Viar Vintech/Viar Wildcat
 Viar Star NX/Viar Pegasus
 Viar Akasha/Viar Astro
 Viar Uno
 Viar Panama/Viar Milano
 Viar Orion
 Viar Caraka/Viar Urbano
 Viar Q1 Electric Motorcycle

See also 
WIKA Industri Manufaktur
Esemka
Fin Komodo Teknologi
KMWI

References

External links 
Official website
History and information about Viar Motor Indonesia

Indonesian brands
Motorcycle manufacturers
Motorcycle manufacturers of Indonesia
Vehicle manufacturing companies established in 2000
Indonesian companies established in 2000
Companies based in Semarang